János Keresztély Scitovszky de Nagykér (1 November 1785 – 19 October 1866) was a Hungarian prelate, Cardinal of the Roman Catholic Church and Archbishop of Esztergom and Primate of Hungary.

Ancestry
Scitovszky was born into a family of Polish noble origin (originally called Szczytowski). One of its members, Antal (János' grandfather), settled to Szepesváralja, Kingdom of Hungary (present-day Spišské Podhradie, Slovakia) in 1730.

References

External links
Catholic Hierarchy data for this cardinal

1785 births
1866 deaths
19th-century Hungarian cardinals
Cardinals created by Pope Pius IX
Archbishops of Esztergom
Bishops of Pécs
Burials at Esztergom Basilica
Janos
People from Košice-okolie District